Mount Balkanska is the mostly ice-covered mountain rising to 1344 m in Lassus Mountains, northern Alexander Island in Antarctica. It has steep and partly ice-free southwest slopes, and surmounts Nichols Snowfield to the east and Narechen Glacier to the northwest.

The feature is named after the Bulgarian operetta singer Mimi Balkanska.

Location
British mapping in 1971.

Maps
 British Antarctic Territory. Scale 1:200000 topographic map. DOS 610 – W 69 70. Tolworth, UK, 1971
 Antarctic Digital Database (ADD). Scale 1:250000 topographic map of Antarctica. Scientific Committee on Antarctic Research (SCAR). Since 1993, regularly upgraded and updated

Notes

References
 Bulgarian Antarctic Gazetteer. Antarctic Place-names Commission. (details in Bulgarian, basic data in English)
 Mount Balkanska. SCAR Composite Gazetteer of Antarctica

External links
 Mount Balkanska. Copernix satellite image

Balkanska
Bulgaria and the Antarctic